"Lights On" is a single from British grime artist Wiley, featuring vocals from Angel and Tinchy Stryder. It was released as the fourth single from his ninth studio album The Ascent on 7 June 2013 for digital download in the United Kingdom. The song was written by Richard Cowie, Sirach Charles, Kwasi Danquah and produced by Parallel and Angel.

Music video
A music video to accompany the release of "Lights On" was first released onto YouTube on 30 April 2013 at a total length of three minutes and fifty-three seconds. The video was directed by Rohan Blair Mangat. Daisy Ridley appears in the video.

Track listings

Credits and personnel
 Vocals – Wiley, Angel, Tinchy Stryder
 Lyrics – Richard Cowie, Sirach Charles, Kwasi Danquah
 Producer – Parallelm, Angel
 Label: Warner Music

Charts

Release history

References

2013 singles
Wiley (musician) songs
Tinchy Stryder songs
Songs with music by Tinchy Stryder
2013 songs
Warner Music Group singles
Songs written by Wiley (musician)